Hermie and Friends is an American Christian video series for children which ran from 2003 to 2010. The show is 3D animated and stars two caterpillars named Hermie and Wormie.

The show started with a 40-minute Max Lucado video special called Hermie: A Common Caterpillar, based on his book of the same name. The show was turned into a video series that takes place before Hermie became a butterfly. Licensed products include Christian video games, which loosely follow the videos.

It was also broadcast on the Australian Christian Channel in Australia.

Cast and characters
 Tim Conway as Hermie, a green caterpillar who soon becomes a butterfly. Hermie, before being a butterfly, goes on many adventures in Max Lucado's garden. He sometimes at the beginning of the video talks to Max referring to the video's topic. He is known to be the comic-relief most of the time and sometimes he goes "the wrong path" until Wormie warns him not to.
 Don Knotts (2003–2006) and John Causby (2007–2010) as Wormie, a cream white caterpillar who soon also becomes a butterfly. Wormie is Hermie's best friend. He, unlike Hermie, is more kind and friendly but tends to get mad when others don't do right. In most cases he tends to say Bible Verses and explains the meaning mostly to Hermie. He shows to love fruitcake and tends to repeat the word after hearing it. His catchphrase is "Oh boy, here we go again". Knotts died on February 24, 2006, shortly after recording his lines for "To Share or Nut to Share," which was released posthumously. John Causby took over for the remainder of the series.
 Vicki Lawrence as Flo, at first she was called the lying fly, but she mostly tells the truth from now on but sometimes it takes it too far. She is a talkative pink fly. She is also a big fan of the Water Beetles.
 Melissa Disney as Lucy, Hailey's and Bailey's kind-hearted mother. As a mother, she tries everything to discipline her children and lead them to do the right thing and sometimes scolds them from disobeying as seen in "Buzby the Misbehaving Bee." She frequently mentions that she's married, but her husband is never shown. He partially appeared once without his head being seen and it was revealed that his name is Ricky.
 Hailey and Bailey are the red and black lady twins of Lucy. They are always into mischief and sometimes disobey their mother. Hailey's like of tomatoes and Bailey's like of blueberries is shown to be their main conflict in "Hailey and Bailey's Silly Fight."
 Sam Mercurio as:
 Buzby, at first a misbehaving yellow and black bee but is shown later on to follow the rules. Buzby is also an amazing speller (a pun to a spelling game called the Spelling Bee). He loves singing and playing the guitar as much as he loves spelling. He has a niece and nephew named Beebee and Buddy. Buzby’s voice and mannerisms are reminiscent of Elvis Presley as well as 50’s and 60’s greasers.
 Antonio, the leader of the brown ant army of the garden. He is a brave ant and helps protect the garden from bad things. He is sometimes shown wearing a soldier hat. 
 Milt, a blue caterpillar with red spots who also is a neighbor of Hermie.
 God, who listens to the bugs when they pray to Him and provides them with wisdom, guidance and love.
 Frank Peretti as Puffy, the orange dragonfly who is shown in most episodes briefly.
 Tahj Mowry as Webster, a blue and purple spider with yellow spots at first is afraid in a lot of things but later on is shown to be much braver by saying "God is with me". Webster is a smart young spider who wears glasses. He tends to scare others at first without realizing that he is scared of them. He is named after the famous dictionary, Webster Dictionary.
 Third Day as The Waterbeetles, consist of Ringo, Lingo, Zingo, Stringo. They are a famous band in the garden.
 Rick Burgess and Bill "Bubba" Bussey as Iggy and Ziggy, two brown cockroaches who sometimes are mischievous. They are mostly hosts in games or other events throughout the series.
 Judge Reinhold as Stanley, at first was disliked by others due to being a stinkbug. Stanley is a stinkbug who mostly stinks when he's afraid. He is shown to be good at sports. Like Webster, he is disliked by others at first and both are afraid of many things, but Webster seems to be more scared in most things than Stanley.
 Richard Kind as Milo, a green praying mantis who ironically does not know how to pray to God. He owns a snack shack in the garden as he mentions it has been in the garden for generations. He then learns to pray with the help of Hermie and Wormie.
 Dan Lynch as Big Bully Croaker, a giant green bullfrog with a toothless mouth and purple prehensile tongue. He is the only antagonist to make multiple appearances. He causes trouble in the garden and tries to devour the bugs.

Episodes
 Hermie: A Common Caterpillar (January 4, 2003)
 Flo the Lyin' Fly (January 15, 2004)
 Webster the Scaredy Spider (September 15, 2004)
 Buzby, the Misbehaving Bee (February 12, 2005)
 A Fruitcake Christmas (October 1, 2005)
 Stanley the Stinkbug Goes to Camp (February 28, 2006)
 To Share or Nut to Share (August 23, 2006)
 Milo: The Mantis Who Wouldn't Pray (February 10, 2007)
 Buzby and the Grumble Bees (September 22, 2007)
 Hailey and Bailey's Silly Fight (January 26, 2008)
 Hermie and the High Seas (March 15, 2008)
 Skeeter and the Mystery of the Lost Mosquito Treasure (January 4, 2009)
 The Flo Show Creates a Buzz (July 9, 2009)
 Antonio Meets His Match (March 30, 2010)
 Who's in Charge Anyway? (May 1, 2010)

Shorts
Shorts are released in DVDs. It focuses on the episodes main topic usually. It then mainly focuses on Hermie playing a role of fairy tale characters. Sam Mercurio and Melissa Disney provide the narrations. 
The Flood of Lies
The Race of Fear
The Straight Path
Hermielocks
Little Red Hermie in the Mood 
Catterpilla 
Hermie Had a Little Lamb
A Friend In Need
Buzby's Beach Blanket Bug Bash
Win, Lose, or Honey!

References

External links
 Hermie and Friends website
 

Christian animation
Direct-to-video television series